Cypress Grove, California was a stop on the Redondo Beach via Playa Del Rey Line of the Los Angeles streetcar system.

The Cypress Grove stop was located just east of Alla Junction in what is now the Del Rey neighborhood of Los Angeles in Los Angeles County, California. Based on the coordinates in the Geographic Names Information System, the stop was at what is now the intersection of Centinela Avenue and Culver Boulevard.

The planned Venice Del Rey development near the Cypress Grove stop of the Playa Del Rey Line was platted in 1905, and several streets were constructed and named after composers (Beethoven, Verdi, Wagner, Mascagni, et al.), but the residences were never built.

See also
 Alla, California
 Alsace, California
 Motordrome, California
 Machado, California

References

Del Rey, Los Angeles